The 2013–14 Pittsburgh Penguins season was the 47th season for the National Hockey League franchise that was established on June 5, 1967.

Pre-season

Game log 
The Penguins released their 2013 pre-season schedule on June 26, 2013. 

|-  style="background:#ffc;"
| 1 || 15 || 6:00 pm || Pittsburgh Penguins || 4–5 (OT) || Columbus Blue Jackets || ROOT || 0–0–1
|-  style="background:#fcf;"
| 2 || 16 || 7:00 pm || Detroit Red Wings || 4–1 || Pittsburgh Penguins || WPCW-TV || 0–1–1
|-  style="background:#cfc;"
| 3 || 19 || 8:00 pm || Pittsburgh Penguins || 4–3 (SO) || Chicago Blackhawks || ROOT || 1–1–1
|-  style="background:#fcf;"
| 4 || 21 || 4:00 pm || Columbus Blue Jackets || 5–3 || Pittsburgh Penguins || ROOT || 1–2–1
|-  style="background:#cfc;"
| 5 || 23 || 7:00 pm || Chicago Blackhawks || 2–3 (SO) || Pittsburgh Penguins || WPCW-TV || 2–2–1
|-  style="background:#cfc;"
| 6 || 25 || 7:30 pm || Pittsburgh Penguins || 5–1 || Detroit Red Wings || ROOT || 3–2–1
|-

|- style="text-align:center;"
| Legend:       = Win       = Loss       = OT/SO Loss

Statistics 
Updated as of September 25, 2013
Note – Statistics compiled from Official Game/Event Summaries from NHL.com

Injuries

Regular season

Game log 

|-  style="background:#cfc;"
| 1 || 3 || 7:00 pm || New Jersey Devils || 0–3 || Pittsburgh Penguins || Consol Energy Center (18,621) || 1–0–0 || 2
|-  style="background:#cfc;"
| 2 || 5 || 7:00 pm || Buffalo Sabres || 1–4 || Pittsburgh Penguins || Consol Energy Center (18,641) || 2–0–0 || 4
|-  style="background:#cfc;"
| 3 || 8 || 7:00 pm || Carolina Hurricanes || 2–5 || Pittsburgh Penguins || Consol Energy Center (18,451) || 3–0–0 || 6
|-  style="background:#fcf;"
| 4 || 11 || 7:30 pm || Pittsburgh Penguins || 3–6 || Florida Panthers || BB&T Center (18,584) || 3–1–0 || 6
|-  style="background:#cfc;"
| 5 || 12 || 7:00 pm || Pittsburgh Penguins || 5–4 || Tampa Bay Lightning || Times Forum (18,939) || 4–1–0 || 8
|-  style="background:#cfc;"
| 6 || 15 || 7:00 pm || Edmonton Oilers || 2–3 || Pittsburgh Penguins || Consol Energy Center (18,410) || 5–1–0 || 10
|-  style="background:#cfc;"
| 7 || 17 || 7:00 pm || Pittsburgh Penguins || 4–1 || Philadelphia Flyers || Wells Fargo Center (19,735) || 6–1–0 || 12
|-  style="background:#cfc;"
| 8 || 19 || 1:00 pm || Vancouver Canucks || 3–4 SO || Pittsburgh Penguins || Consol Energy Center (18,657) || 7–1–0 || 14
|-  style="background:#fcf;"
| 9 || 21 || 7:30 pm || Colorado Avalanche || 1–0 || Pittsburgh Penguins || Consol Energy Center (18,606) || 7–2–0 || 14
|-  style="background:#fcf;"
| 10 || 25 || 7:00 pm || New York Islanders || 4–3|| Pittsburgh Penguins || Consol Energy Center (18,664) || 7–3–0 || 14
|-  style="background:#fcf;"
| 11 || 26 || 7:00 pm || Pittsburgh Penguins || 1–4 || Toronto Maple Leafs || Air Canada Centre (19,539) || 7–4–0 || 14
|-  style="background:#cfc;"
| 12 || 28 || 7:00 pm || Pittsburgh Penguins || 3–1 || Carolina Hurricanes || PNC Arena (15,042) || 8–4–0 || 16
|-  style="background:#cfc;"
| 13 || 30 || 8:00 pm || Boston Bruins || 2–3 || Pittsburgh Penguins || Consol Energy Center (18,627) || 9–4–0 || 18
|-

|-  style="background:#cfc;"
| 14 || 1 || 7:00 pm || Columbus Blue Jackets || 2–4 || Pittsburgh Penguins || Consol Energy Center (18,620) || 10–4–0 || 20
|-  style="background:#cfc;"
| 15 || 2 || 7:00 pm || Pittsburgh Penguins || 3–0 || Columbus Blue Jackets || Nationwide Arena (18,634) || 11–4–0 || 22
|-  style="background:#fcf;"
| 16 || 6 || 7:30 pm || Pittsburgh Penguins || 1–5 || New York Rangers || Madison Square Garden (18,006) || 11–5–0 || 22
|-  style="background:#fcf;"
| 17 || 9 || 8:00 pm || Pittsburgh Penguins || 1–2 || St. Louis Blues || Scottrade Center (18,685) || 11–6–0 || 22
|-  style="background:#fcf;"
| 18 || 13 || 8:00 pm || Philadelphia Flyers || 1–2 || Pittsburgh Penguins || Consol Energy Center (18,656) || 11–7–0 || 22
|-  style="background:#cfc;"
| 19 || 15 || 7:00 pm || Nashville Predators || 1–4 || Pittsburgh Penguins || Consol Energy Center (18,606) || 12–7–0 || 24
|-  style="background:#fcf;"
| 20 || 16 || 7:00 pm || Pittsburgh Penguins || 1–4 || New Jersey Devils || Prudential Center (14,205) || 12–8–0 || 24
|-  style="background:#cfc;"
| 21 || 18 || 7:30 pm || Anaheim Ducks || 1–3 || Pittsburgh Penguins || Consol Energy Center (18,604) || 13–8–0 || 26
|-  style="background:#cfc;"
| 22 || 20 || 7:30 pm || Pittsburgh Penguins || 4–0 || Washington Capitals || Verizon Center (18,506) || 14–8–0 || 28
|-  style="background:#cfc;"
| 23 || 22 || 7:00 pm || New York Islanders || 3–4 || Pittsburgh Penguins || Consol Energy Center (18,515) || 15–8–0 || 30
|-  style="background:#fcf;"
| 24 || 23 || 7:00 pm || Pittsburgh Penguins || 2–3 || Montreal Canadiens || Bell Centre (21,273) || 15–9–0 || 30
|-  style="background:#ffc;"
| 25 || 25 || 7:00 pm || Pittsburgh Penguins || 3–4 OT || Boston Bruins || TD Garden (17,565) || 15–9–1 || 31
|-  style="background:#cfc;"
| 26 || 27 || 7:30 pm || Toronto Maple Leafs || 5–6 SO || Pittsburgh Penguins || Consol Energy Center (18,660) || 16–9–1 || 33
|-  style="background:#cfc;"
| 27 || 29 || 4:00 pm || Pittsburgh Penguins || 3–0 || Tampa Bay Lightning || Times Forum (19,065) || 17–9–1 || 35
|-  style="background:#cfc;"
| 28 || 30 || 7:00 pm || Pittsburgh Penguins || 5–1 || Florida Panthers || BB&T Center (17,583) || 18–9–1 || 37
|-

|-  style="background:#cfc;"
| 29 || 3 || 7:00 pm || Pittsburgh Penguins || 3–2 OT || New York Islanders || Nassau Coliseum (13,915) || 19–9–1 || 39
|-  style="background:#cfc;"
| 30 || 5 || 7:00 pm || San Jose Sharks || 1–5 || Pittsburgh Penguins || Consol Energy Center (18,522) || 20–9–1 || 41
|-  style="background:#fcf;"
| 31 || 7 || 7:00 pm || Pittsburgh Penguins || 2–3 || Boston Bruins || TD Garden (17,565) || 20–10–1 || 41
|-  style="background:#cfc;"
| 32 || 9 || 7:30 pm || Columbus Blue Jackets || 1–2 || Pittsburgh Penguins || Consol Energy Center (18,520) || 21–10–1 || 43
|-  style="background:#cfc;"
| 33 || 13 || 7:00 pm || New Jersey Devils || 2–3 || Pittsburgh Penguins || Consol Energy Center (18,582) || 22–10–1 || 45
|-  style="background:#cfc;"
| 34 || 14 || 7:00 pm || Pittsburgh Penguins || 4–1 || Detroit Red Wings || Joe Louis Arena (20,066) || 23–10–1 || 47
|-  style="background:#cfc;"
| 35 || 16 || 7:00 pm || Toronto Maple Leafs || 1–3 || Pittsburgh Penguins || Consol Energy Center (18,573) || 24–10–1 || 49
|-  style="background:#cfc;"
| 36 || 18 || 8:00 pm || Pittsburgh Penguins || 4–3 SO || New York Rangers || Madison Square Garden (18,006) || 25–10–1 || 51
|-  style="background:#cfc;"
| 37 || 19 || 7:00 pm || Minnesota Wild || 2–5 || Pittsburgh Penguins || Consol Energy Center (18,623) || 26–10–1 || 53
|-  style="background:#cfc;"
| 38 || 21 || 1:00 pm || Calgary Flames || 3–4 || Pittsburgh Penguins || Consol Energy Center (18,663) || 27–10–1 || 55
|-  style="background:#fcf;"
| 39 || 23 || 7:30 pm || Pittsburgh Penguins || 0–5 || Ottawa Senators || Canadian Tire Centre (19,838) || 27–11–1 || 55
|-  style="background:#cfc;"
| 40 || 27 || 7:00 pm || Pittsburgh Penguins || 4–3 OT || Carolina Hurricanes || PNC Arena (18,124) || 28–11–1 || 57
|-  style="background:#cfc;"
| 41 || 29 || 6:00 pm || Pittsburgh Penguins || 5–3 || Columbus Blue Jackets || Nationwide Arena (18,871) || 29–11–1 || 59
|-  style="background:#fcf;"
| 42 || 31 || 1:00 pm || Pittsburgh Penguins || 1–2 || New Jersey Devils || Prudential Center (16,592) || 29–12–1 || 59
|-

|-  style="background:#cfc;"
| 43 || 3 || 7:00 pm || New York Rangers || 2–5 || Pittsburgh Penguins || Consol Energy Center (18,668) || 30–12–1 || 61
|-  style="background:#cfc;"
| 44 || 5 || 1:00 pm || Winnipeg Jets || 5–6 || Pittsburgh Penguins || Consol Energy Center (18,652) || 31–12–1 || 63
|-  style="background:#cfc;"
| 45 || 7 || 10:00 pm || Pittsburgh Penguins || 5–4 SO || Vancouver Canucks || Rogers Arena (18,910) || 32–12–1 || 65
|-  style="background:#ffc;"
| 46 || 10 || 10:00 pm || Pittsburgh Penguins || 3–4 OT || Edmonton Oilers || Rexall Place (16,839) || 32–12–2 || 66
|-  style="background:#cfc;"
| 47 || 11 || 10:00 pm || Pittsburgh Penguins || 2–1 || Calgary Flames || Scotiabank Saddledome (19,289) || 33–12–2 || 68
|-  style="background:#cfc;"
| 48 || 15 || 8:00 pm || Washington Capitals || 3–4 || Pittsburgh Penguins || Consol Energy Center (18,667) || 34–12–2 || 70
|-  style="background:#fcf;"
| 49 || 20 || 7:00 pm || Florida Panthers || 5–1 || Pittsburgh Penguins || Consol Energy Center (18,660) || 34–13–2 || 70
|-  style="background:#cfc;"
| 50 || 22 || 7:00 pm || Montreal Canadiens || 1–5 || Pittsburgh Penguins || Consol Energy Center (18,617) || 35–13–2 || 72
|-  style="background:#cfc;"
| 51 || 23 || 7:30 pm || Pittsburgh Penguins || 6–4 || New York Islanders || Nassau Coliseum (15,012) || 36–13–2 || 74
|-  style="background:#fcf;"
| 52 || 25 || 8:00 pm || Pittsburgh Penguins || 0–3 || Dallas Stars || American Airlines Center (18,532) || 36–14–2 || 74
|-  style="background:#cfc;"
| 53 || 27 || 7:30 pm || Buffalo Sabres || 0–3 || Pittsburgh Penguins || Consol Energy Center (18,563) || 37–14–2 || 76
|-  style="background:#cfc;"
| 54 || 30 || 10:30 pm || Pittsburgh Penguins || 4–1 || Los Angeles Kings || Staples Center (18,118) || 38–14–2 || 78
|-

|-  style="background:#fcf;"
| 55 || 1 || 8:00 pm || Pittsburgh Penguins || 1–3 || Phoenix Coyotes || Jobing.com Arena (17,362) || 38–15–2 || 78
|-  style="background:#cfc;"
| 56 || 3 || 7:00 pm || Ottawa Senators || 1–2 OT || Pittsburgh Penguins || Consol Energy Center (18,579) || 39–15–2 || 80
|-  style="background:#cfc;"
| 57 || 5 || 7:30 pm || Pittsburgh Penguins || 5–1 || Buffalo Sabres || First Niagara Center (18,408) || 40–15–2 || 82
|-  style="background:#ffc;"
| 58 || 7 || 7:00 pm || New York Rangers || 4–3 SO || Pittsburgh Penguins || Consol Energy Center (18,661) || 40–15–3 || 83
|-  style="background:#bbb;"
|colspan=9| Olympic break (February 9–25)
|-  style="background:#ffc;"
| 59 || 27 || 7:00 pm || Montreal Canadiens || 6–5 SO || Pittsburgh Penguins || Consol Energy Center (18,636) || 40–15–4 || 84
|-

|-  style="background:#fcf;"
| 60 || 1 || 8:00 pm || Pittsburgh Penguins || 1–5 || Chicago Blackhawks || Soldier Field (62,921) || 40–16–4 || 84
|-  style="background:#cfc;"
| 61 || 4 || 8:00 pm || Pittsburgh Penguins || 3–1 || Nashville Predators || Bridgestone Arena (17,113) || 41–16–4  || 86
|-  style="background:#fcf;"
| 62 || 6 || 10:30 pm || Pittsburgh Penguins || 3–5 || San Jose Sharks || SAP Center (17,562) || 41–17–4 || 86
|-  style="background:#cfc;"
| 63 || 7 || 10:00 pm || Pittsburgh Penguins || 3–2 SO || Anaheim Ducks || Honda Center (17,518) || 42–17–4 || 88
|-  style="background:#cfc;"
| 64 || 10 || 7:00 pm || Pittsburgh Penguins || 3–2 || Washington Capitals || Verizon Center (18,506) || 43–17–4 || 90
|-  style="background:#cfc;"
| 65 || 11 || 7:30 pm || Washington Capitals || 0–2 || Pittsburgh Penguins || Consol Energy Center (18,646) || 44–17–4 || 92
|-  style="background:#fcf;"
| 66 || 15 || 1:00 pm || Pittsburgh Penguins || 0–4 || Philadelphia Flyers || Wells Fargo Center (19,993) || 44–18–4 || 92
|-  style="background:#fcf;"
| 67 || 16 || 7:30 pm || Philadelphia Flyers || 4–3 || Pittsburgh Penguins || Consol Energy Center (18,647) || 44–19–4 || 92
|-  style="background:#cfc;"
| 68 || 18 || 7:00 pm || Dallas Stars || 1–5 || Pittsburgh Penguins || Consol Energy Center (18,659) || 45–19–4 || 94
|-  style="background:#ffc;"
| 69 || 20 || 7:30 pm || Pittsburgh Penguins ||  4–5 OT || Detroit Red Wings || Joe Louis Arena (20,066) || 45–19–5 || 95
|-  style="background:#cfc;"
| 70 || 22 || 1:00 pm || Tampa Bay Lightning || 3–4 OT || Pittsburgh Penguins || Consol Energy Center (18,668) || 46–19–5 || 97
|-  style="background:#fcf;"
| 71 || 23 || 1:00 pm || St. Louis Blues || 1–0 || Pittsburgh Penguins || Consol Energy Center (18,662) || 46–20–5 || 97
|-  style="background:#fcf;"
| 72 || 25 || 7:00 pm || Phoenix Coyotes || 3–2 || Pittsburgh Penguins || Consol Energy Center (18,632) || 46–21–5 || 97
|-  style="background:#fcf;"
| 73 || 27 || 7:00 pm || Los Angeles Kings || 3–2 || Pittsburgh Penguins || Consol Energy Center (18,650) || 46–22–5 || 97
|-  style="background:#cfc;"
| 74 || 28 || 7:00 pm || Pittsburgh Penguins || 2–1 || Columbus Blue Jackets || Nationwide Arena (18,908) || 47–22–5 || 99
|-  style="background:#cfc;"
| 75 || 30 || 7:30 pm || Chicago Blackhawks || 1–4 || Pittsburgh Penguins || Consol Energy Center (18,655) || 48–22–5 || 101
|-

|-  style="background:#fcf;"
| 76 || 1 || 7:00 pm || Carolina Hurricanes || 4–1 || Pittsburgh Penguins || Consol Energy Center (18,635) || 48–23–5 || 101
|-  style="background:#cfc;"
| 77 || 3 || 8:00 pm || Pittsburgh Penguins || 4–2 || Winnipeg Jets || MTS Centre (15,004) || 49–23–5 || 103
|-  style="background:#fcf;"
| 78 || 5 || 8:00 pm || Pittsburgh Penguins || 0–4 || Minnesota Wild || Xcel Energy Center (19,409) || 49–24–5 || 103
|-  style="background:#cfc;"
| 79 || 6 || 8:00 pm || Pittsburgh Penguins || 3–2 SO || Colorado Avalanche || Pepsi Center (18,007) || 50–24–5 || 105
|-  style="background:#cfc;"
| 80 || 9 || 8:00 pm || Detroit Red Wings || 3–4 SO || Pittsburgh Penguins || Consol Energy Center (18,620) || 51–24–5 || 107
|-  style="background:#ffc;"
| 81 || 12 || 3:00 pm || Philadelphia Flyers || 4–3 OT || Pittsburgh Penguins || Consol Energy Center (18,673) || 51–24–6 || 108
|-  style="background:#ffc;"
| 82 || 13 || 7:00 pm || Ottawa Senators || 3–2 OT || Pittsburgh Penguins || Consol Energy Center (18,663) || 51–24–7 || 109
|-

|- style="text-align:center;"
| Legend:       = Win       = Loss       = OT/SO Loss

Season standings

Detailed records 
Final

Injuries 
Final

Suspensions/fines

Playoffs

Game log 
The Pittsburgh Penguins entered the playoffs as the Metropolitan Division's first seed. They defeated the Columbus Blue Jackets in the first round 4–2. After taking a 3–1 second round series lead following Game 4, they went on to lose the final three games as the New York Rangers defeated the Penguins in a 2–1 Game 7 decision.

|-  style="background:#cfc;"
| 1 || April 16 || Columbus || 3–4 || Pittsburgh || || Fleury || 18,646 || 1–0 || Recap
|-  style="background:#fcf;"
| 2 || April 19 || Columbus || 4–3 || Pittsburgh || 2OT || Fleury || 18,619 || 1–1 || Recap
|-  style="background:#cfc;"
| 3 || April 21 || Pittsburgh || 4–3 || Columbus || || Fleury || 19,148 || 2–1 || Recap
|-  style="background:#fcf;"
| 4 || April 23 || Pittsburgh || 3–4 || Columbus || OT || Fleury || 18,970 || 2–2 || Recap
|-  style="background:#cfc;"
| 5 || April 26 || Columbus || 1–3 || Pittsburgh || || Fleury || 18,618 || 3–2 || Recap
|-  style="background:#cff;"
| 6 || April 28 || Pittsburgh || 4–3 || Columbus || || Fleury || 19,189 || 4–2 || Recap
|-

|-  style="background:#fcf;"
| 1 || May 2 || New York || 3–2 || Pittsburgh || OT || Fleury || 18,622 || 0–1 || Recap
|-  style="background:#cfc;"
| 2 || May 4 || New York || 0–3 || Pittsburgh || || Fleury || 18,638 || 1–1 || Recap
|-  style="background:#cfc;"
| 3 || May 5 || Pittsburgh || 2–0  || New York || || Fleury || 18,006 || 2–1 || Recap
|-  style="background:#cfc;"
| 4 || May 7 || Pittsburgh || 4–2 || New York || || Fleury || 18,006 || 3–1 || Recap
|-  style="background:#fcf;"
| 5 || May 9 || New York || 5–1 || Pittsburgh || || Fleury || 18,633 || 3–2 || Recap
|-  style="background:#fcf;"
| 6 || May 11 || Pittsburgh || 1–3 || New York || || Fleury  || 18,006 || 3–3 || Recap
|-  style="background:#fcf;"
| 7 || May 13 || New York || 2–1 || Pittsburgh ||  || Fleury  || 18,635 || 3–4 || Recap
|-

|- 
| ''Legend:       = If needed       = Win       = Loss       = Playoff series win

Injuries
Final

Post-season

Injuries

Statistics
Final Stats

Skaters

 Team Total includes Skater Statistics, Goaltender Statistics and Bench Minor Penalties.

Goaltenders

†Denotes player spent time with another team before joining the Penguins.  Stats reflect time with the Penguins only.
‡Denotes player was traded mid-season.  Stats reflect time with the Team only.
Bold/italics denotes franchise record.

Team

 – Denotes league leader.

Notable achievements

Awards

Team awards 
Awarded week of April 6

Milestones

Transactions
The Penguins have been involved in the following transactions during the 2013–14 season:

Trades

Free agents

Waivers

Signings

Other 

Notes
  – Two-way contract
  – Entry-level contract

Draft picks 

Pittsburgh Penguins' picks at the 2013 NHL Entry Draft, which was held in Newark, New Jersey on June 30, 2013.

Draft notes

 The Pittsburgh Penguins' first-round pick went to the Calgary Flames as the result of a March 28, 2013 trade that sent Jarome Iginla to the Penguins in exchange for the rights to Kenny Agostino, Ben Hanowski and this pick.
 The Pittsburgh Penguins' second-round pick went to the San Jose Sharks as the result of a March 25, 2013 trade that sent Douglas Murray to the Penguins in exchange for a 2014 second-round pick and this pick.
 The Columbus Blue Jackets second-round pick went to the Pittsburgh Penguins as a result of a June 30, 2013 trade that sent a 2013 second-round pick (#50–from San Jose) and a 2013 third-round pick (#89) to the Blue Jackets in exchange for this pick.
 The Minnesota Wild's third-round pick went to the Pittsburgh Penguins (via Philadelphia and Dallas) as a result of a March 24, 2013 trade that sent Joe Morrow and a 2013 fifth-round pick to the Stars in exchange for Brenden Morrow and this pick.
 The Pittsburgh Penguins' fifth-round pick went to the Dallas Stars as the result of a March 24, 2013 trade that sent Brenden Morrow and a 2013 third-round pick to the Penguins in exchange for a Joe Morrow and this pick.
 The Winnipeg Jets' sixth-round pick went to the Pittsburgh Penguins as a result of a February 13, 2013 trade that sent Eric Tangradi to the Jets in exchange for this pick.

References 

Pittsburgh Penguins seasons
Pittsburgh Penguins season, 2013-14
Pitts
Pittsburgh Penguins
Pittsburgh Penguins